Panic Room is a 2002 American thriller film directed by David Fincher. The film stars Jodie Foster and Kristen Stewart as a mother and daughter whose new home is invaded by burglars, played by Forest Whitaker, Jared Leto, and Dwight Yoakam. The script was written by David Koepp, whose screenplay was inspired by news coverage in 2000 about panic rooms.

The film was Fincher's fifth feature film, following Fight Club (1999). Fincher and Koepp brought together a crew of people with whom each had worked before. The house and its panic room were built on a Raleigh Studios lot. Nicole Kidman was originally cast as the mother, but she left after aggravating a previous injury. Her departure threatened the completion of the film, but Foster quickly replaced Kidman. The filmmakers used computer-generated imagery to create the illusion of the film camera moving through the house's rooms. Foster became pregnant during the shooting schedule, so filming was suspended until after she gave birth. The film's production cost .

The film grossed  on its opening weekend. In the United States and Canada, it grossed . The film was well-received by critics, who praised Foster's performance and the film's suspense. Panic Room has been assessed for its portrayal of childhood and feminism, the elements of video surveillance and diabetes, and its thematic approach to mortality.

Plot
Recently divorced Meg Altman and her eleven-year-old daughter, Sarah, move into a four-story brownstone in New York City's Upper West Side. The house's previous owner, a reclusive millionaire, installed a "panic room" to protect the occupants from intruders. The room is reinforced by concrete and steel on all sides and a thick steel door. There is also an extensive security system with multiple surveillance cameras and a public address system.

On Meg and Sarah's first night, three men break into the home: Junior, the previous owner's grandson; Burnham, an employee of the home's security company; and Raoul, a thug Junior has recruited. They intend to steal bearer bonds locked inside a floor safe inside the panic room by the previous owners, as Junior doesn't want to share them with his extended family when his grandfather's estate is settled in probate.

When Meg awakes during the night to use the bathroom, she sees the men on the security cameras, and she and Sarah rush to the panic room. To force them out, the men pump propane gas into the room's air vents. Meg ignites the gas while she and Sarah cover themselves with fireproof blankets; the ignited propane leaves Junior badly burned. Meg taps into the main telephone line and calls her ex-husband, Stephen. As she attempts to explain their situation, the intruders cut the line, abruptly ending the call.

When all attempts to breach the room fail, Junior gives up on the robbery, while letting slip that there is more money in the safe than he initially disclosed. When he attempts to leave, Raoul fatally shoots him then forces Burnham to continue with the robbery. Stephen arrives and is immediately taken hostage. Raoul severely beats him, making sure Meg sees it on the security camera. Sarah, a diabetic, then suffers a seizure as her glucagon syringes are in her bedroom.

Raoul tricks Meg into thinking it is safe to temporarily leave the panic room and, when she leaves to retrieve Sarah's medication, the men enter the room with Sarah inside. Meg manages to throw the med kit in just as Burnham closes the door, inadvertently crushing Raoul's hand. She pleads with the men to give Sarah her medication, which Burnham does. Two policemen later arrive at the house following up on Stephen's earlier 911 call and complaints from the neighbors. To protect Sarah, Meg convinces the officers everything is fine and they leave. Meanwhile, Burnham opens the safe and finds $22 million in bearer bonds inside.

As the men prepare to leave using Sarah as a hostage, Meg leads them into an ambush where she uses a sledgehammer to knock Raoul over a banister and into a stairwell. As Burnham flees, the injured Raoul crawls back up and overpowers Meg, preparing to bludgeon her with the sledgehammer. Burnham, hearing Sarah's terrified screams, rushes back and shoots Raoul, killing him. The police, alerted by Meg's earlier odd behavior, arrive back at the house in force and apprehend Burnham, who is forced to drop the bearer bonds, which scatter in the wind.

A few days later, Meg and Sarah search the newspaper for a new, smaller home, having recovered from their harrowing ordeal.

Cast

Jodie Foster stars as Meg Altman, a recently divorced woman who, with her daughter Sarah, looks for a new home in New York City. Nicole Kidman was originally cast as Meg, but she left the project due to a knee injury. Foster, who almost joined the cast of Fincher's 1997 film The Game, replaced Kidman. Fincher said Kidman's portrayal was "about glamour and physicality", while Foster's portrayal was "more political". Meg was originally written to be helpless, but with Foster's involvement, the character was revised to be stronger. The casting change also led to Meg's being rewritten to be similar to her daughter, whereas Meg had been different from her before. Foster became pregnant soon after she started filming. She told the filmmakers, and they decided to keep filming her scenes but with a wardrobe that would conceal her pregnancy. Studio executives did not like the dailies and suspended production until Foster gave birth and returned to perform re-shoots. Foster was reportedly paid  for her role.

Kristen Stewart stars as Sarah, Meg's diabetic daughter. Hayden Panettiere was originally cast as Sarah, but when she left the project toward the end of 2000, Stewart was cast in the role. Panic Room was Stewart's second feature film after The Safety of Objects (2001). When Kidman was cast as Meg, Fincher said Stewart was "to complement [Kidman's portrayal], to be her antithesis, tomboyish, androgynous, dismissive, a teenager at ten years old. It was about the daughter being a parent to her mother." When Foster replaced Kidman, the character Meg was rewritten so she and Sarah would be similar.

Forest Whitaker, Jared Leto, and Dwight Yoakam star as the film's burglars, Burnham, Junior, and Raoul, respectively. Whitaker's character Burnham was originally written to be "a slick, technical type" and the designer of the panic room in Meg and Sarah's home. Fincher did not think a designer could be persuaded to break into a home, so he rewrote the character to be a blue-collar worker who installs panic rooms for a living. The director told Whitaker to watch Key Largo (1948) and to emulate Humphrey Bogart's character. Whitaker said he liked Burnham's "conflicted" nature and preferred it to Raoul's villainy. Raoul was originally written to be "a giant scary hulking guy", but Fincher rewrote him to be "this wiry, mean kind of ex-con white trash guy". In one revised instance, Raoul punches Meg instead of slapping her to be reinforced as "an appalling character". The role of Raoul was originally offered to Maynard James Keenan, whom Fincher had directed in a music video for A Perfect Circle's "Judith". Keenan was too busy as the lead singer for Tool, so Fincher then offered the role to Yoakam, knowing him from his performance in Sling Blade (1996). For the role of Junior, Fincher cast Leto, who was in the cast of Fincher's previous film Fight Club (1999). As part of atypical class division, Junior is "the uptown rich kid", where Burnham is blue-collar, and Raoul is undefinable.

Patrick Bauchau had a minor role as Meg's ex-husband Stephen. Kidman, though she left the primary role due to her knee injury, had an uncredited off-screen role as the voice of Stephen's supermodel girlfriend. Screenwriter Andrew Kevin Walker, who was a credited writer for Seven and The Game and an uncredited writer for Fight Club, had a cameo in Panic Room as a sleepy neighbor.

Production

 David Fincher – director
 David Koepp – screenwriter, producer
 Ceán Chaffin – producer
 Judy Hofflund – producer
 Gavin Polone – producer
 Howard Shore – composer
 Conrad W. Hall – cinematographer
 Darius Khondji – cinematographer
 James Haygood – editor
 Angus Wall – editor
 Arthur Max – production designer
 Keith Neely – art director
 James E. Tocci	– art director
 Jon Danniells – set decorator
 Garrett Lewis – set decorator
 Michael Kaplan – costume designer

Panic Room was directed by David Fincher based on a screenplay written by David Koepp. The film, produced at Columbia Pictures, was Fincher's fifth feature film, following Fight Club (1999). Koepp was also a producer for Panic Room, and he was joined by Judy Hofflund and Gavin Polone, with whom he collaborated on Stir of Echoes (1999). Fincher included as producer Ceán Chaffin, with whom he had worked on commercials and music videos. Fincher also included in his initial crew people with whom he had worked before: cinematographer Darius Khondji, production designer Arthur Max, costume designer Michael Kaplan, and editors James Haygood and Angus Wall.

Fincher envisioned Panic Room as a popcorn movie about survival. His previous film Fight Club had 400 scenes and 100 locations, so he wanted to simplify the production of Panic Room. To this end, he wanted to focus production on a single set and to plan the scenes and shots thoroughly before the start of filming. Despite the preparation, he experienced difficulty in production with changes in the cast and the crew as well as the inherent inflexibility of his initial planning.

Development
Screenwriter David Koepp was inspired by news coverage in 2000 about how safe rooms were becoming prevalent among the wealthy living in urban areas. Before Fincher's involvement, director Ridley Scott was briefly connected to the project, and actor-director Forest Whitaker studied the script before declining the opportunity to direct. Fincher said he was interested in the script's omniscience and that he was reminded of "the specific subjectivity" of Rear Window (1954). He also saw Panic Room as a cross between Rear Window and Straw Dogs (1971), though he was concerned "a modern audience" would compare Panic Room more to Home Alone (1990) than to Rear Window.

Fincher also saw Panic Room as a crime thriller similar to The Treasure of the Sierra Madre (1948), where money is "an object that everyone's after for the wrong reasons". The director was also interested in the story's conciseness of happening in one place and in one night, and how the screenplay was well-laid out to let the director decide a variety of shots and use of set-pieces. Fincher also saw the project as a way to be "in lock-step with the audience" in a change of pace from his previous films.

Koepp's screenplay emphasized pace over exposition. Koepp and Fincher agreed to streamline the film so the opening would introduce the characters as soon as possible. Fincher also sought to lay out the film so audiences could see characters make plans and thus be ahead of them, calling the tense foresight "a very cinematic notion". He wanted to track the different characters' agendas and to also keep scenes chronological, so he set up "computer-generated motion-control shots" to move the camera around the set. He planned scenes in which parallel scenes could be seen through the panic room's video monitors and also intercut between different characters. The final screenplay was similar in outline to the original one; there were minor changes in dialogue and specific moments, especially in the interaction between Meg and Sarah Altman due to Foster replacing Kidman. Explicit mention of Sarah's diabetes, such as the emergency syringe containing glucagon, were removed from the dialogue. Careful beverage intake, refrigerated medicine bottles, and Sarah's glucometer watch were intended as evidence of her diabetes.

Pre-production
The house was built on a soundstage on a Raleigh Studios lot. The set was designed by production designer Arthur Max, and it cost  to build. Three versions of the room were built so Fincher could film scenes from multiple angles. A 3D computer model of the set on the soundstage was designed. Fincher, who had done pre-visualization for Fight Club, used the model to design shots and decide their sequence. The computer model also enabled the camera to have "total freedom to travel" inside the house. Fincher said, "What we were just trying to do with CG was to say, there's no camera operator, there's no crew, there's no track, and the camera can go everywhere." The crew applied photogrammetry—"mapping still images over the surface of computer-generated 'sets'". The filming schedule was also shortened since camera setups could be evaluated and discarded virtually. Fincher had two-thirds of Panic Rooms shots planned before the start of filming. Director Steven Soderbergh reviewed Fincher's test footage and warned him that excessive planning would make actual production difficult for him and his crew.

Fincher sought to light his film less than most other films; he believed darkness contributed to the scare factor. Entering production, he initially planned to film the first half of the film in near-total darkness but decided that it required too much patience from audiences. Instead, he chose a "shadowy ambience" as a backdrop for Meg and Sarah Altman.

Filming

Casting began in 2000, with Nicole Kidman and Hayden Panettiere cast as Meg and Sarah Altman, the film's mother and daughter. Forest Whitaker, Jared Leto, and Dwight Yoakam were also cast as the film's burglars. In December 2000, before the start of filming, Panettiere left the project, and was replaced by Kristen Stewart. Filming began in January 2001. Shortly after the start of filming, cinematographer Darius Khondji was fired from the film. Khondji said he was fired after a conflict with a crew member that he did not want to name, but David Fincher said he and Khondji could not agree "on aspects of production". Much of the film was already planned in pre-production, and Khondji could not be given flexibility. Fincher replaced Khondji with Conrad W. Hall, with whom he found "a balance". Khondji said he supported Hall as his replacement.

After two weeks of filming, at the end of January 2001, Kidman was injured on set. An x-ray revealed a hairline fracture underneath one of her knee joints. The fracture was an injury from Kidman's filming of Moulin Rouge! (2001), and the fracture had never fully healed. When Kidman left the project, Fincher continued filming scenes that did not include her character. During the same time of Kidman's departure, the Writers Guild of America and the Screen Actors Guild were threatening to strike over contractual disputes, so Fincher was pressured to re-cast the role of Meg Altman before it took place. Since the film was early in production, Fincher was ready to shut down, but the studio wanted to continue production and find a replacement. If the studio had shut down production permanently, it would have collected  from insurance. If production was shut down then restarted, it would cost the studio , necessitating a quick replacement for Kidman. Rumored actors included Sandra Bullock, Angelina Jolie, and Robin Wright. Jodie Foster was previously occupied with directing duties of Flora Plum before its star Russell Crowe was injured and left the project, leading to that production's shutdown. To join Panic Room, Foster also stepped down as head of the awards jury at the 2001 Cannes Film Festival. Foster had a week to prepare for her role before filming resumed.

Five weeks after Foster began filming Panic Room, she learned she was pregnant. She informed Fincher and his producer Chaffin of her pregnancy, and they decided to continue filming. Fincher did not want to rush production, so Foster changed her wardrobe from a tank top to a heavy sweater to disguise indications of her pregnancy. For action scenes, stunt double Jill Stokesberry replaced Foster.

In the film's progression, the house degrades in quality, so Fincher filmed scenes in continuity as the set changed. He also filmed many sequences twice due to their near-parallel appearance on the panic room's video monitors. One repeated take was when Raoul attempts to break into the panic room through the plaster ceiling below it. The plaster took 45 minutes to replace, so combined with repeated takes, a scene that was an eighth of a page in the script took two days to film. Another repeated take was one five-second shot being filmed over a hundred times: Meg being attacked by Raoul and dropping Sarah's medical kit. The shot was repeated so it would look like Meg did not toss the kit but instead lost it. Simultaneously, the kit needed to land in frame and in focus for the audience. Fincher argued for repeated takes so he could combine performances by the actors for "fluid" scenes. He also repeated takes with Stewart to ensure that her acting would be comparable to Foster's veteran performance.

The studio planned to release Panic Room in February 2002, but it determined that production could not be completed by then. Executives reviewed dailies of the film's opening scene and did not like Foster "hiding her stomach under a coat and purse". (Foster was also suffering from a sprained hip from distended ligaments due to her pregnancy.) The studio suspended production until after Foster's childbirth and rescheduled for the film to be released in March 2002. Foster gave birth in September 2001, and she returned to perform re-shoots, including the opening scene. She also returned two months later for additional filming, which concluded that November. Columbia Pictures screened the film for test audiences, who rated poorly the ending with the SWAT raid and Burnham's capture. By the screening, the set had been deconstructed due to storage costs, and Fincher estimated that it would cost  to rebuild enough of the set to reshoot the ending. Instead, editors Haygood and Wall revisited Burnham's scenes and chose takes in which the character would appear less sympathetic.

Visual and practical effects

A seamless shot at the beginning of Panic Room took nine days to film on set but took several months to complete in post-production. The shot was a combination of camera footage and computer-generated effects. Koepp originally wrote the opening scene to be a series of shots that would zero in on the brownstone house, but Fincher instead chose a sequence of landmarks in New York City with credits hovering in front of them before the sequence transited seamlessly to introduce the film's main characters. The opening titles were inspired by those seen in The Trouble with Harry (1955) and North by Northwest (1959). The scene of Burnham's arrest also used computer-generated effects. Several scenes also involved practical effects: Junior's injuries from a flaming gas burn and Stephen Altman's bloodied, beaten self. A team of puppeteers was used to move Stephen's sticking-out collarbone. Fincher also sent the film reel to be digitally color-corrected as he had done for Fight Club and Seven.

Analysis

Conspiracy thrillers and feminism
Academic Jyotsna Kapur identifies Panic Room as one of several American conspiracy thrillers in the 2000s that re-cast the subject of childhood as "one of horror and alarm", where it had previously been a subject of celebration in family films dating back to the early 1980s. Kapur also says the depiction of paranoia in the decade's conspiracy thrillers is divided by gender, describing the male protagonist as "an idealized subject who thinks fast on his feet and cuts through fear to find the conspirators". In contrast, the female protagonist "gives in to her fear, turns delusional and vulnerable to suggestion"; Kapur cites Meg Altman in Panic Room as such a depiction with her divorcee status and her residence in a home too big for her and her daughter Sarah. The academic says calling this depiction merely a sexist stereotype is too dismissive: "It is logical that anxieties around the home and loss of children would privilege women because the domestic sphere has remained a gendered space." Kapur recalls 1940s films wherein a woman enters the husband's home as a stranger, with "the house and the husband as sources of dependence and dread". She contrasts them with films like Panic Room, in which the female protagonists instead defend against dangerous intruders. She writes, "They are not economically dependent on the marriage. Yet they portray for most of the film an image of feminized vulnerability, replaying the racist trope of diminutive white women in need of protection from outsider threats."

Medicine and technology as themes
Panic Room is one of several films at the turn of the 21st century that use video surveillance as a key element. In particular, video surveillance is featured to illustrate aspects of a "surveillance society". The home is wired with a closed-circuit television system, and the images are displayed in the home's panic room. Since the burglars want to access the safe in the panic room where Meg and her daughter Sarah are hiding, there is an irreconcilable contradiction of freedom and safety. Dietmar Kammerer says there is no closed system within the home for the characters: "There is always communication; every action provokes a reaction." In contrast, the film's "camera eye" can travel unimpeded throughout the home, passing through walls. The surveillance footage in the film is never the camera eye; the camera eye itself observes the footage on the monitors. Of the cameras, Kammerer says, they are "Extremely mobile, but unstable: the surveillance technology in Panic Room is useful and harmful, good and evil at once." When the cameras are destroyed, Meg and Sarah are able to overcome the burglars. Kammerer says the cameras reflect ambivalence in the film, between "freedom and security, openness and closedness".

In the film, Sarah is diabetic. Kevin L. Ferguson says, "With diabetes, this self-aware focus on the ethics of the body is drawn sharply by films that also raise the older form of direct, punitive power. This is the reason why diabetics appear with frequency in films involving criminality and law." In a review of nearly forty films with diabetes as a key element, Panic Room is one of the only three that shows a glucometer (a device diabetics use to measure their glucose; Sarah wears a glucometer as a watch.) Sarah's diabetes in the film is never explicitly outlined for audiences, but they hear dialogue about moderating beverage intake and see the glucometer count down. Ferguson says, "The glucometer arranges the viewer's acknowledgement of diabetic selfcare, thus implicating the viewer in the process of control. The pure watchfulness of cinemagoers mimics the controlling relationship diabetic characters must endure." Though mother and daughter bond in the film, the mother actively monitors her daughter's health. Ferguson says, "Panic Rooms emphasis on vision and technology necessitates a paternalistic, monitoring attitude towards the diabetic character." He also notes that the glucometer parallels the overarching surveillance system in the film in being read "excessively".

Approach to mortality
Academic John Kitterman says audiences see Panic Room as a way to confront their fears and to achieve catharsis, but he argues that the film cannot provide that experience authentically. He notes that the film's protagonist Meg Altman is reminded by the panic room of author Edgar Allan Poe, who wrote several short stories related to premature burial. Kitterman highlights one story, "The Premature Burial", as synonymous with Panic Room. He says, in both works, "It is in the representing or acting out of such fears of being buried alive or being the victim of a home invasion that the protagonist actually calls for that trauma to happen." He says that Meg's nervous recognition of the panic room guarantees that her fear will come to pass. Though the home "looks like a mausoleum", the combination of the panic room's being able to monitor all the rooms and the unbounded movement of the film's camera leads audiences to believe they have some control over confronting their fears. Kitterman says the confrontation is unauthentic because of the function of Jacques Lacan's symbolic order, "We can never find what we are looking for because truth and reality exist on a different plane of discovery... Truth is hidden in the symbolic order, and no panoptical vision is going to reveal it to us." Kitterman says the film hides the truth of mortality, especially by making everywhere in the film visible to audiences. He concludes, "[Fincher] hides the truth behind a veil of visibility, using the camera to create a hegemony of vision that brainwashes us all into believing that what we are seeing is real. But the real of death cannot be symbolized."

Theatrical run
Columbia Pictures marketed Panic Room as being produced by the same director who produced Seven and Fight Club. Fincher disagreed with the approach because he believed that Panic Room did not match the tone of his previous two films and that it would not appeal to the same audiences. He believed Panic Room would appeal more to audiences who saw Kiss the Girls (1997) and The Bone Collector (1999). He also disagreed with the studio's marketing materials for Panic Room, which advertised it as "the most terrifying movie ever made". Fincher also argued with the studio about the poster design, which he believed reflected the film's themes, and the studio relented in publishing Fincher's poster.

Fincher refused to edit the film to receive a PG-13 rating (parental guidance for children under 13) from the Motion Picture Association of America, so the MPAA gave the film an R rating (restricted to filmgoers at least 17 years old) for violence and language. It was commercially released in the United States and Canada on March 29, 2002. It ranked first at the box office, and for both actor Jodie Foster and director David Fincher, the opening weekend gross was a personal best to date. It surpassed The Matrix (1999) to have the biggest Easter holiday-weekend opening and also had the third biggest opening to date for a non-supernatural thriller film, following Hannibal (2001) and Ransom (1996). Audiences polled by CinemaScore, during the opening-weekend, gave Panic Room an average a "B" grade on an A+ to F scale. The audience demographic was 53% female and 47% male, and 62% of audience members were aged 25 years and older.

The film was Fincher's second highest-grossing to date after Seven, which grossed  worldwide. In the United States and Canada, Panic Room ranks fifth among David Fincher's films in box office gross. Adjusted for inflation, Panic Room ranks third. Worldwide, unadjusted for inflation, it ranks fifth.

Critical reception
Critics called Panic Room "a high-tension narrative". They compared the film to the works of Alfred Hitchcock, both positively and negatively. Several critics thought the film was too mainstream after Fincher's Fight Club. Rotten Tomatoes reported that 76% of 188 sampled critics gave the film positive reviews, with an average rating of 6.9/10. The consensus states: "Elevated by David Fincher's directorial talent and Jodie Foster's performance, Panic Room is a well-crafted, above-average thriller." Metacritic, which uses a weighted average, gave the film a score of 65 out of 100 based on 36 critics, indicating "generally favorable reviews".

Joe Morgenstern of The Wall Street Journal said, "Seven was stylishly gloomy, and Fight Club was smarmily pretentious, while Panic Room has been admirably stripped down to atmosphere as a function of architecture, and action as a consequence of character." Morgenstern commended the characters Meg and Sarah as feminist heroines and also called the home invaders "intriguing". He also applauded Foster's performance and the film's cinematography, and he said to Koepp's script as "all worked out too". Film critic Roger Ebert gave the film three stars out of four, describing Panic Room as close to "the ideal of a thriller existing entirely in a world of physical and psychological plausibility." Ebert wrote, "There are moments when I want to shout advice at the screen, but just as often the characters are ahead of me." Ebert also called Fincher "a visual virtuoso", and applauded Foster's performance as "spellbinding".

Home media
Panic Room was first released on VHS and DVD on September 17, 2002. The studio produced VHS copies only for rental and not for sale, believing that owners of DVD players were more likely to buy the film. The studio used the design from the theatrical release poster for the video cover, where Fincher had wanted a black cover that would differ from the poster. Though previsualization supervisor Ron Frankel wanted to include materials to show storyboard animation, the DVD was released as a single-disc edition with no audio commentary or other features. Fincher also chose not to include on the DVD scenes filmed with Nicole Kidman before she was replaced by Jodie Foster. In its first week, the film ranked second in DVD sales after Monsters, Inc., though it ranked first in DVD rentals. In March 2004, the studio released a special edition DVD, which consisted of three discs, two which provided featurettes of the pre-production, production, and post-production processes for the film. The DVD also had several commentary tracks, including one by the director. Author John T. Caldwell cites the special edition DVD of Panic Room as an example of demonstrating directorial control to "aesthetically elevate" the film.

Columbia Pictures sold the television rights for Panic Room to Turner Broadcasting and CBS, who shared the rights over five years. In September 2004, Turner aired the film on channels TBS and TNT for 12 months, and afterward, CBS aired the film three times in an 18-month span. Turner resumed airing Panic Room for 30 months after CBS's turn.

A Blu-ray version of the film has yet to be released, but it is available in 1080p HD on Amazon Prime Video, iTunes, Google Play, and other streaming services.

Accolades
Howard Shore won from the American Society of Composers, Authors and Publishers an ASCAP Award in the Top Box Office Film music category for his scores for Panic Room and The Lord of the Rings: The Two Towers. The Art Directors Guild nominated Panic Room for the Excellence in Production Design for a Contemporary Film Award. The Online Film Critics Society Award nominated Panic Room for Best Editing. Panic Room won an award at the 3rd Golden Trailer Awards for having the Best Horror/Thriller film trailer, beating fellow nominees Signs, Brotherhood of the Wolf, Jurassic Park III, and No Such Thing. For her performance in the film, Jodie Foster was nominated for a Saturn Award for Best Actress.

See also

 List of films featuring home invasions
 List of films featuring surveillance
 List of films featuring diabetes
 List of thriller films of the 2000s
 List of American films of 2002
 Cinema of the United States

Notes

References

Footnotes

Bibliography

Further reading

 
 
  (Novelization based on the screenplay written by David Koepp.)

External links

 
 

2002 films
2002 crime thriller films
2002 psychological thriller films
American crime thriller films
American psychological thriller films
Columbia Pictures films
Films about security and surveillance
Films directed by David Fincher
Films produced by David Koepp
Films scored by Howard Shore
Films set in New York City
Films shot in Los Angeles
Films shot in New York City
Films with screenplays by David Koepp
Home invasions in film
Films about mother–daughter relationships
2000s English-language films
2000s American films